Thirumanam is a 1958 Indian Tamil-language romance film directed by A. Bhimsingh, and produced and written by Valampuri Somanathan. The film stars Gemini Ganesan and Savitri. It revolves around a singer who does not sing for money, believing there is a curse upon him that if he did so, he would die.

Thirumanam is the first film produced by the studio Valampuri Pictures. While primarily black-and-white, it featured some dance sequence which were shot in Gevacolor. The film was released on 18 July 1958 and failed commercially. No print of the film is known to survive, making it a lost film.

Plot 
Brothers Chidambaram and Nataraj live in a village. They hail from a family of musicians. The brothers do not sing for money, since they believe there is a curse upon the family that if they sing for money, they would die. In the face of poverty Nataraj goes to Madras in search of a job. He stays in the bungalow of Damodharam, a friend of Chidambaram. Damodharam's daughter Vani falls in love with Nataraj. Damodharam, who learns about the financial difficulty faced by his friend through Nataraj, sends money to Chidambaram but Chidambaram returns the money as his policy is not to receive money from others without doing any work. Enraged, Vani tells Nataraj that people with so much self-respect should not have come to their house. Nataraj leaves the house. He saves a clerk from robbers. The  clerk gives accommodation to Nataraj. Vani feels sorry for Nataraj and somehow finds his new place of stay.

Damodharam decides to have their marriage ceremony. Vani discovers that Nataraj can sing. She arranges for him to sing in a radio broadcast. Nataraj says about the curse but Vani brushes away that saying it is superstitious. Nataraj agrees with her and sings on the radio. He receives payment for his performance and sends money to his elder brother. In the meantime, Nataraj gives accommodation to another girl named Mullai in the house. Vani becomes suspicious and stops the marriage arrangements. When he learns that Nataraj sang for money, Chidambaram dies of shock. Upon learning of Chidambaram's death, Nataraj returns to the village. He becomes mentally unbalanced. Doctors say that he cannot be cured by medicine. Mullai decides that he can be cured only by bringing Vani. The rest of the story deals with what happens afterwards.

Cast 

Male cast
Gemini Ganesan as Nataraj
K. A. Thangavelu as Adambaram
V. Nagayya as Chidambaram
S. V. Ranga Rao as Damodharam
N. Viswanathan as Sundar
V. R. Rajagopal as Rajagopal
Ashokan as Ashokan

Female cast
Savitri as Vani
M. N. Rajam as Mullai
P. Hemalatha as Mangalam
Sandhya as Sandhya
M. S. S. Bhagyam as Bhagyam
Baby Uma as Megalai
Suryakantham as Kanthammal

Supporting cast
K. M. Nambirajan
Rama Rao
Sharma
Karikol Raju

Dance
Gopi Krishna
Kamala Lakshman
B. Saroja Devi

Production 
Thirumanam was the inaugural production of the studio Valampuri Pictures. It was directed by A. Bhimsingh and written by Valampuri Somanathan, who also produced the film. Cinematography was handled by G. Vittal Rao and C. F. Marconi, and the art direction by P. P. Chowdhri. Photography was handled by Thirumalai, and the choreography by Vazhuvoor Ramaiah Pillai, Gopi Krishna, Thangaraju, and Thangappan. The film was processed at Bharani Studio. Although primarily black-and-white, the film featured some dance sequence which were shot in Gevacolor.

Soundtrack 
The soundtrack was composed by S. M. Subbaiah Naidu and T. G. Lingappa while the lyrics were written by Thanjai N. Ramaiah Dass, Kannadasan, Subbu Arumugam, Suratha, Pattukkottai Kalyanasundaram and M. K. Athmanathan. There were two songs, one each written by poets Subramania Bharati and Ramalinga Swamigal. The song "Mangiyathor Nilavinile", based on Bharati's poem of the same name, is set in the Carnatic raga known as Desh, "Ennamellam Or Idathaye" is set in Sahana, and "Thanga Nilavil" is set in Abheri.

Release and reception 
Thirumanam was released on 18 July 1958, by Palaniyappa Film Corporation. It was previously scheduled for Diwali 1957. On 25 July 1958, The Indian Express stated, "Thirumanam is a film that really holds the audience. [Bhimsingh's] direction has made the tale of a village family that falls on evil times owing to its faithfulness to tradition memorable." However, the film was not commercially successful. No print of the film is known to survive, making it a lost film.

References

Bibliography

External links 

1950s lost films
1950s romance films
1950s Tamil-language films
1958 films
Films about superstition
Films directed by A. Bhimsingh
Films scored by S. M. Subbaiah Naidu
Films scored by T. G. Lingappa
Indian romance films
Lost Indian films
Lost romance films